Gaibandha-3 is a constituency represented in the Jatiya Sangsad (National Parliament) of Bangladesh since 2014 by Eunus Ali Sarkar of the Awami League.

Boundaries 
The constituency encompasses Palashbari and Sadullapur upazilas.

History 
The constituency was created in 1984 from a Rangpur constituency when the former Rangpur District was split into five districts: Nilphamari, Lalmonirhat, Rangpur, Kurigram, and Gaibandha.

Members of Parliament

Elections

Elections in the 2010s 
The Bangladesh Nationalist Party (BNP) candidate, TIM Fazle Rabbi Chowdhury, died ten days before the 30 December 2018 general election. Voting in the constituency was postponed until 27 January 2019. The BNP selected Moinul Hasan Sadik to run in his place.

Elections in the 2000s

Elections in the 1990s

References

External links
 

Parliamentary constituencies in Bangladesh
Gaibandha District